Fight is Sister Sparrow & the Dirty Birds's first and so far their only EP, released on October 1, 2013, on Modern Vintage Recordings. The album was produced by former American Idol judge Randy Jackson.

Track list

References

2013 EPs
Sister Sparrow & the Dirty Birds albums